Doodle Hex is a fighting video game for Nintendo DS. The game was created by Spanish developer Tragnarion Studios and published by Pinnacle Software, in which players much draw runes on the touch screen to attack opponents in order to retrieve all the pieces of the One Wish Rune. A Wii version was planned but cancelled.

Reception

Doodle Hex received fairly average reviews from critics. The unique battle system was praised but the repetitiveness and relative complexity were panned.

References

2008 video games
Nintendo DS games
Nintendo DS-only games
Cancelled Wii games
Fighting games
Video games developed in Spain